The Situation Room is a conference room and intelligence management center in the White House.

Situation Room may also refer to:
 Situation Room (photograph), taken in 2011 in the White House Situation Room during the killing of Osama bin Laden
 "Situation Room", a song by Something for Kate from the 2021 album The Modern Medieval

Other uses
 The Situation Room with Wolf Blitzer, an afternoon newscast on CNN

See also
 Incident room, a room reserved and equipped for the handling of major incidents
 The War Room (disambiguation)